Yamburg was the name of the town of Kingisepp, Russia, from 1703 to 1922

Yamburg may also refer to:
Yamburg, Yamalo-Nenets Autonomous Okrug, a settlement in Yamalo-Nenets Autonomous Okrug, Russia
Yamburg Airport located nearby
Yamburg gas field